Mitchell Robinson (born 7 June 1989) is a former Australian rules footballer who played for  and  in the Australian Football League (AFL), he is also a professional Fortnite esports player, Twitch streamer and YouTuber.

Robinson is a midfielder/half-forward who played junior football in Tasmania. In 2008, he played eleven games for the Tasmanian Devils Football Club in the Victorian Football League, as well as two games for the Lauderdale Football Club seniors in the Southern Football League, and one game for the Tassie Mariners in the TAC Cup. He featured prominently at the AFL Under 18s Championship, winning Hunter-Harrison Medal as the best player in Division Two of the competition. He was drafted by the Carlton Football Club with its 3rd round selection (No. 40 overall) in the 2008 AFL National Draft, and made his debut in Round 1, 2009 against Richmond at the M.C.G., scoring three goals.

Robinson played sporadically in the AFL in his first two seasons, playing 26 of 46 possible games for Carlton and spending the rest of the time with  Northern Bullants. His breakthrough came in the 2011 season, when he won a regular place in the team, and became a key ball-winner in the midfield; at midseason, Herald Sun commentator Mark Robinson heralded him as the league's most improved player. He went on to finish seventh in the John Nicholls Medal count for the season, and was selected to represent Australia in the 2011 International Rules Series.

Robinson quickly became popular with Carlton fans for his hardness at the ball – often in apparent disregard for his own safety, due to his shark-like tendencies to the point where his style is sometimes described as "kamikaze".

Robinson was involved in some off-field incidents during his time at Carlton. He was involved in a fight at the 2013 Big Day Out festival, and was fined $1,000 by the club as a result. Then in August 2014, Robinson suffered a fractured eye socket when he and Jeff Garlett became unwittingly involved in a brawl outside a nightspot at 5 am on a Sunday morning; Robinson lied about the incident, telling the club he had sustained the injury in a boxing session at training, and he was fined $5,000 by the club.

Robinson was delisted by Carlton after the 2014 season, having played 100 games for Carlton, after lying about the incident with teammate Jeff Garlett. He was then signed as a delisted free agent by the Brisbane Lions. In 2015 he was the joint winner of the Merrett–Murray Medal as Brisbane's best and fairest, alongside Dayne Beams, Stefan Martin and Dayne Zorko.

Robinson announced his delisting from the Brisbane Lions on Instagram, following their 71 point loss to Geelong during the 2022 Preliminary Final. He officially retired a few days later.

Statistics
Updated to the end of finals week 1, 2022.

|-
| 2009 ||  || 12
| 10 || 5 || 5 || 71 || 54 || 125 || 41 || 28 || 0.5 || 0.5 || 7.1 || 5.4 || 12.5 || 4.1 || 2.8 || 0
|- 
| 2010
|  || 12
| 16 || 14 || 4 || 133 || 109 || 242 || 51 || 67 || 0.9 || 0.3 || 8.3 || 6.8 || 15.3 || 3.2 || 4.2 || 0
|-
| 2011 ||  || 12
| 23 || 10 || 21 || 304 || 213 || 517 || 121 || 97 || 0.4 || 0.9 || 13.2 || 9.3 || 22.5 || 5.3 || 4.2 || 9
|- 
| 2012 ||  || 12
| 18 || 12 || 10 || 213 || 166 || 379 || 94 || 93 || 0.7 || 0.6 || 11.8 || 9.2 || 21.1 || 5.2 || 5.2 || 6
|-
| 2013 ||  || 12
| 21 || 11 || 12 || 237 || 170 || 407 || 64 || 82 || 0.5 || 0.6 || 11.3 || 8.1 || 19.4 || 3.0 || 3.9 || 2
|- 
| 2014 ||  || 12
| 12 || 6 || 5 || 124 || 115 || 239 || 56 || 49 || 0.5 || 0.4 || 10.3 || 9.6 || 19.9 || 4.7 || 4.1 || 1
|-
| 2015 ||  || 5
| 21 || 10 || 7 || 220 || 217 || 437 || 81 || 142 || 0.5 || 0.3 || 10.5 || 10.3 || 20.8 || 3.9 || 6.8 || 3
|- 
| 2016 ||  || 5
| 21 || 3 || 3 || 220 || 241 || 461 || 59 || 128 || 0.1 || 0.2 || 10.5 || 11.5 || 22.0 || 2.8 || 6.1 || 3
|-
| 2017 ||  || 5
| 7 || 9 || 2 || 68 || 69 || 137 || 27 || 29 || 1.3 || 0.3 || 9.7 || 9.9 || 19.6 || 3.9 || 4.1 || 0
|- 
| 2018 ||  || 5
| 19 || 11 || 7 || 199 || 201 || 400 || 78 || 103 || 0.6 || 0.4 || 10.5 || 10.6 || 21.1 || 4.1 || 5.4 || 1
|-
| 2019 ||  || 5
| 23 || 17 || 12 || 347 || 148 || 495 || 121 || 99 || 0.7 || 0.5 || 15.1 || 6.4 || 21.5 || 5.3 || 4.3 || 5
|- 
| 2020 ||  || 5
| 19 || 5 || 3 || 182 || 79 || 261 || 66 || 44 || 0.3 || 0.2 || 9.6 || 4.2 || 13.7 || 3.5 || 2.3 || 1
|-
| 2021 ||  || 5
| 22 || 7 || 7 || 297 || 133 || 430 || 98 || 64 || 0.3 || 0.3 || 13.5 || 6.0 || 19.5 || 4.5 || 2.9 || 3
|-
| 2022 ||  || 5
| 15 || 9 || 2 || 121 || 67 || 188 || 41 || 26 || 0.6 || 0.1 || 8.1 || 4.5 || 12.5 || 2.7 || 1.7 ||
|- class=sortbottom
! colspan=3 | Career
! 247 !! 129 !! 101 !! 2736 !! 1982 !! 4718 !! 998 !! 1051 !! 0.5 !! 0.4 !! 11.1 !! 8.0 !! 19.1 !! 4.0 !! 4.3 !! 34
|}

Notes

Other media 

Robinson signed with professional e-sports Fortnite team The Chiefs Esports Club on 4 December 2018.

Robinson hosted a 24-hour charity stream on Twitch playing Fortnite to raise money for the New South Wales Rural Fire Service with a goal of raising $5,000 on 4 January 2020. Over the course of the event, he raised $12,424.. He also has a YouTube Channel which he posts vlogs about his life and the AFL.

References

External links

1989 births
Living people
Australian rules footballers from Tasmania
Twitch (service) streamers
Australian YouTubers
Carlton Football Club players
Tassie Mariners players
Tasmanian Devils Football Club players
Preston Football Club (VFA) players
Brisbane Lions players
Merrett–Murray Medal winners
Australia international rules football team players
Lauderdale Football Club players